is a professional Japanese baseball player. He plays outfielder for the Yokohama DeNA BayStars.

External links

 NPB.com
 Yokohama DeNA Baystars.com

1993 births
Living people
People from Izumi, Osaka
Japanese baseball players
Nippon Professional Baseball outfielders
Yokohama DeNA BayStars players
Baseball people from Osaka Prefecture